Kandali Festival is a festival held by the Rung tribe of the Pithoragarh district of Uttarakhand state in India. This festival coincides with the blooming of the Kandali plant, which flowers once every twelve years. It is held in the Chaundas Valley between August and October. It celebrates the defeat of Zorawar Singh's army, which attacked this area from Ladakh in 1841.

The Ritual
Folklore says that soldiers returning along the Kali River looted the villages on the way, hiding in the Kangdali plants. The women resisted them, destroying the Kangdali plants. This is re-enacted during the festival.

Another tale tells of a boy who died after applying the paste of the root from a shrub known as Kan-Dali on his wound. Enraged, his mother cursed the shrub and ordered the Rung women to pull up the root of the Kan-Dali plant off its ground upon reaching its full bloom, which happens once in twelve years.

A victory dance is performed every twelve years upon the destruction of this shrub in its blooming period. The women lead a procession, each armed with a ril, a tool which was used in compacting carpet on a loom. The children and men follow closely behind, armed with swords and shields. As they sing and dance, their music echoes in the valley, and upon approaching the blooms, warlike tunes are played and war cries are uttered. The women attack the bushes with their rils. The men follow up by hacking the bushes with swords, and then uproot the bushes and take them back, as the spoils of war. Victory cries are raised and rice is cast towards the sky to honour the deities with the prayer that the people of Chaundas Valley may always be victorious over their enemies. After the victory dance and the extermination of the shrub, the festival is concluded with a feast.

References

External links 
 Rung Mung

Festivals in Uttarakhand
Pithoragarh district
August observances
September observances
October observances
Hindu festivals